V. T. Murali is an Indian playback singer and music critic from Kerala. He is known for many songs including the song "Othu palliyilannu nammal" composed by Padma Shri K. Raghavan from the movie Thenthulli directed by National award-winning director K. P. Kumaran. He was a former board member of Kerala State Film Development.  Corporation. He is also the president of K Rakhavan master Award foundation As a music critic, Murali has written 12 books.

Biography
He was born to V. T. Kumaran and Santha.

Vadakara Krishnadasan Master taught himthe basics of music. In his music, Murali has sung in many local plays. After his undergraduate degree at Madappally College, he passed Gana Bhushanamcourse from Sree Swathithirunal Music College, Thiruvananthapuram. Later, he became a student of K. V. Narayanaswamy, V. Rajan Iyer and V. Krishnamurthy of Madras Music College, Palakkad. The first film to be sung was in 1979. A communist follower, he has sung in many plays of KPAC. He sang for drama troupes like KPAC, Thiruvananthapuram Sangh Chetana and Kozhikode Kalinga.

Currently a member of the Executive Committee of the Kerala Sangeethanataka Akademi, he was earlier a member of the General Council of the Kerala Sangeethanataka Akademi and the Director of the Kerala State Film Development Corporation.

Personal life
He and his wife Sasikala have 2 daughters. They lives in their house Manjima at Vadakara, Kozhikode district.

Books written on Music

Vakkukal Padum Nadiyoram (2019)

Awards and honours
Kerala Sangeetha Nataka Akademi Awards - 2003 - Best Singer (Drama)
Kerala Sangeetha Nataka Akademi Award - 2007 - Best Singer (light music)
Raghavan Master Award
Thoppil Bhasi Award of Kuwait Kerala Association
Abu Dhabi Yuvakalasahithi Kampisseri Award
Chandpasha Award of Kerala Mappila Kala Akademi
Gramadeepam Award
He was honoured by Kerala Sangeetha Nataka Akademi, Kerala State Chalachitra Academy and Kerala Folklore Academy by celebrating 50th year of his singing career, in 2019.

References

Living people
Indian male playback singers
Malayalam playback singers
Malayali people
Film musicians from Kerala
20th-century Indian singers
21st-century Indian singers
20th-century Indian male singers
21st-century Indian male singers
1955 births
Recipients of the Kerala Sangeetha Nataka Akademi Award